Another Ticket is the seventh solo studio album by Eric Clapton. Recorded and produced by Tom Dowd at the Compass Point Studios in Nassau, Bahamas with Albert Lee, it was Clapton's last studio album for RSO Records before the label shut down in 1983 as it was absorbed by Polydor Records. It received moderate reviews and achieved modest commercial success peaking at No. 18 in the UK charts.

Release
It was his last album for RSO Records. Another Ticket was recorded at the Compass Point Studios in Nassau, Bahamas and features fellow guitarist and country legend, Albert Lee. The album was originally released as a gramophone record, accompanied by a music cassette. In 1990 the album was released on compact disc format and was made available for digital music download in 1996.

Chart performance
The studio album was successful in the charts, reaching the Top 40 in seven countries, three of which, it peaked in the Top 10. In New Zealand, the release reached its highest position on No. 3. In Norway and in the United States, Another Ticket reached Nos. 5 and 7, respectively. In the United Kingdom, the release placed itself at No. 18. In Germany and Sweden, the album reached No. 26. In the Netherlands, Another Ticket peaked at No. 38.

Reception
In a retrospective review for AllMusic, William Ruhlmann feels that the album is "star-crossed", "not too shabby", and while it "wasn't great Clapton" it should have got more notice than it did. Rolling Stone journalist John Piccarella notes: "Rita Mae” [...] is the only song on side two that’s not about dying. It's about murder. As an artist often criticized for mellowing out, Eric Clapton has succeeded in making very popular music from an authentic and deeply tragic blues sensibility. He addresses both the heart and the charts in the same way: with a bullet."

Songs
Record World said of the title track that "light keyboard melodies back Clapton's little tenor and the production is superb."

Track listing

Personnel 
 Eric Clapton – guitars, vocals
 Gary Brooker – keyboards, backing vocals
 Chris Stainton – keyboards
 Albert Lee – guitars, backing vocals
 Dave Markee – bass 
 Henry Spinetti – drums, percussion

Production 
 Tom Dowd – producer, engineer
 Michael Carnevale – engineer at Compass Point Studios.
 Kendal Stubbs – assistant engineer at Compass Point Studios.
 Bob Castle – assistant engineer at Criteria Studios.
 Jon Walls – assistant engineer at AIR Studios.
 Mike Fuller – mastering at Criteria Studios.
 Rob O'Connor – art direction, design 
 Steve Sandon – photography 
 Alan Dempsey – hand lettering

Charts

Weekly charts

Year-end charts

Certifications

References

External links
 

Eric Clapton albums
1981 albums
Albums produced by Tom Dowd
RSO Records albums